Anastasia Tsakiri (born ) is a Greek female weightlifter, competing in the 63 kg category and representing Greece at international competitions. She participated at the 2004 Summer Olympics in the 63 kg event. She competed at world championships, most recently at the 2002 World Weightlifting Championships.

Major results

References

External links
 

1979 births
Living people
Greek female weightlifters
Weightlifters at the 2004 Summer Olympics
Olympic weightlifters of Greece
Place of birth missing (living people)
World Weightlifting Championships medalists
Mediterranean Games gold medalists for Greece
Mediterranean Games medalists in weightlifting
Competitors at the 2001 Mediterranean Games
Sportspeople from Bologna
20th-century Greek women